The  is a  suburban railway line in Japan which runs from Ikebukuro Station in Toshima, Tokyo to Yorii Station in Yorii, Saitama, operated by the private railway operator Tobu Railway.

The Tojo Line and Tobu Ogose Line branch are isolated from other Tobu lines, such as the Isesaki Line and Nikko Line; some trains can however be transported between the Tojo Line and the rest of the Tobu network via the track connections with the Chichibu Main Line while on the ATS-Chichibu-type. There was a plan to connect between Nishiarai on the Isesaki Line and Kami-Itabashi on the Tojo Line, but this was never built.

Stations

Abbreviations:
 L =  (some to/from the Fukutoshin Line and Yūrakuchō Line)
 SE = 
 E =   (some to/from the Fukutoshin Line)
 RE =  (some to/from the Fukutoshin Line)
 KL = 
 TJ = TJ Liner (morning "up" services and evening "down" services)
 FL = F Liner to/from the Fukutoshin Line, Tokyu Toyoko Line, and Minatomirai Line
The line is operated as two sections: Ikebukuro-Ogawamachi and Ogawamachi-Yorii. There are no through services between the sections.

Notes

Former connecting lines
 Kami-Itabashi Station: The Tobu Keishi Line operated to the Grant Heights USAF housing complex (present-day Hikarigaoka) between 1943 and July 1959.

Rolling stock

Past rolling stock
 Tobu 3000 series EMUs
 Tobu 5000 series EMUs
 Tobu 5310 series EMUs (on Flying Tojo limited express services from 1949)
 Tobu 7300 series EMUs
 Tobu 7800 series EMUs
 Tokyo Metro 7000 series 8-car EMUs (between Wakoshi and Shiki, until April 2022)
 Tokyo Metro 7000 series 10-car EMUs (between Wakoshi and Ogawamachi, until October 2021)
 Tokyo Metro 07 series EMUs (between Wakōshi and Kawagoeshi, until October 2007)

Rolling stock depots
The main maintenance depot for the line is Shinrinkoen Depot, to the north of Shinrinkoen Station. This opened in March 1971, and as of December 2013 has an allocation of 678 vehicles (the entire fleet used on the Tojo Line and Ogose Line). A smaller maintenance depot is also located at Kawagoe, on the south side of Kawagoeshi Station. This was the main maintenance depot from the time the line first opened in 1914 until the larger facility at Shinrinkoen was built in 1971. Kawagoe Depot still carries out lighter maintenance and inspection duties. A stabling yard is located to the south of Shimo-Itabashi Station. Built in 1935, this is capable of stabling eight 10-car trains, and is used for stabling trains close to Ikebukuro outside the peak hours.

Crew operation
The line is operated by two-person crews (except for the section between Ogawamachi and Yorii, which is one-person operated). Crews report to either Shiki, Kawagoeshi, or Shinrinkōen stations. Mainline crew changeovers take place in Ikebukuro Station, Wakōshi Station, Kawagoeshi Station, or Shinrinkōen Station. Changeovers at Wakōshi are only for through trains from Tokyo Metro lines, where Tobu Railway and Tokyo Metro crews change each other. Crews may have to travel by scheduled trains in order to reach a handover point, particularly crews picking up trains in Wakōshi, or Shiki crews. Handovers in Ikebukuro are to facilitate short turnaround times while allowing crews to take brief breaks.

History

The section from Shimo-Itabashi to Ikebukuro was initially treated as a light railway extension of the main line. Two years later, the line was extended  from Kawagoemachi (now Kawagoeshi) to Sakadomachi (now Sakado), and at the same time, the section between Kawagoemachi and Tanomosawa was abandoned.

In 1920, the Tojo Railway was absorbed into the Tobu Railway, and in 1923, the line was extended  from Sakadomachi to Ogawamachi. In 1925, the line was further extended  from Ogawamachi to Yorii, completing the present-day Tobu Tojo Line. While the original plan had been to extend the line as far as Gunma Prefecture, the connection at Yorii did at least allow for through operations via the Chichibu Railway.

The line from Ikebukuro to Yorii was electrified in October 1929. The  Ogose Line from Sakadomachi to Ogose was not opened until much later, in 1943. With the steadily growing population along the line, trains were gradually increased in length to the maximum 10 cars seen today, and the original single track was doubled and even quadrupled in some places (between Wakōshi and Shiki).

The Ikebukuro to Shiki section was double-tracked between 1935 and 1937, extended to Kawagoe in 1954, to Higashi-Matsuyama between 1965 and 1968, to Shinrinkoen in 1977, and to Musashi-Ranzan between 2002 and 2005.

The name was inspired by the Flying Scotsman express train service running in Britain. This service continued until December 1967. Steam for freight haulage on the line was finally withdrawn in 1959.

Freight services ceased in 1986. In 1987, the Yurakucho Line reached Wakōshi, allowing through-running from Kawagoeshi on the Tobu Tojo Line to the then terminus of Shintomichō (later extended further east to the present terminus of Shinkiba).

November 1993 timetable revision
 Fujimino station opens. Interchange between Express and Semi-express trains moved from Kawagoeshi to Fujimino.

March 1998 timetable revision
 Express services make an additional stop at Asakadai.

March 2005 timetable revision
(From 17 March 2005)
 Express trains extended from Musashi-Ranzan to Ogawamachi following completion of double-tracking
 Limited express trains terminated at Ogawamachi (rather than Yorii). Standardized as 10 cars, and include stop at Wakōshi.
 Driver-only operation starts on Ogawamachi to Yorii section. All trains are 4 cars.

June 2008 timetable revision
From the start of the revised timetable on 14 June 2008, new limited-stop evening TJ Liner services commenced using new 50090 series rolling stock. Six down services operate on weekdays, with four at weekends. Trains from Ikebukuro stop at Fujimino, Kawagoe, Kawagoeshi, Sakado, Higashi-Matsuyama, and Shinrinkōen, with some services continuing to Ogawamachi stopping at Tsukinowa and Musashiranzan stations. Limited Express services were discontinued and replaced by new  services. Daytime express services were increased from four to five per hour, and semiexpress services were reduced from four to three per hour. All trains operating out of Ikebukuro are standardized as 10-car trains.

March 2011 timetable revision
From the start of the revised timetable on 5 March 2011, TJ Liner services were increased from six to nine on weekday evenings. The irregularly spaced daytime express services were adjusted to run at 12-minute intervals, and semi-express services were adjusted to run at 20-minute intervals.

From 17 March 2012, station numbering was introduced on all Tobu lines. Tobu Tojo Line and Ogose Line stations were numbered prefixed with the letters "TJ".

From 10 September 2012, 10-car 5050-4000 series sets entered revenue service on the Tobu Tojo Line, with inter-running through to the Tokyo Metro Fukutoshin Line.

March 2013 timetable revision
New "Rapid" services were introduced, with the previous daytime off-peak pattern of five Express services hourly changed to four Express and two Rapid services per hour in each direction.

March 2016 timetable revision
Weekday morning TJ Liner services were introduced in the up direction to Ikebukuro. Morning  services were discontinued from this date.

March 2019 timetable revision 
Following the revised timetable introduced on 16 March 2019, a new service type named  has begun operation. These trains will use special 50090 series rolling stock nicknamed "", with full transverse seating, and with unique Kawagoe-themed external wrapping, designed by Koyano Yuuki, a famous young artist. Passengers will be able to board them without paying an additional Limited Express charge. These trains aim to further establish the notation that "Sightseeing in Kawagoe = Tobu Tojo Line", and to increase convenience of travelling to Kawagoe for residents and visitors.

There are 2 northbound, 4 southbound services on weekends, and 2 northbound, 3 southbound services on weekdays. Services stop at Ikebukuro, Asakadai, Kawagoe, Kawagoe-shi, Sakado and all stations between Higashi-Matsuyama and Ogawamachi. In comparison to the former Limited Express service which was discontinued in 2008, the Kawagoe Limited Express skips Wakoshi and stops at Asakadai.

March 2023 timetable revision 

Along with the opening of the Tōkyū Shin-Yokohama Line and Sōtetsu Shin-Yokohama Line on 18 March 2023,  services, which were introduced in 2013, were abolished on the Tōjō Line. The same timetable revision also saw Kami-Itabashi Station being added to semi-express services. Rapid express trains now stop at Asakadai instead of Shiki and stop all stations northwest of Kawagoe whilst being the new service type of F-Liner trains, replacing the previous express service type. Express trains now make an additional stop at Asaka. TJ Liner trains towards Ikebukuro also operate on weekends & public holidays. Kawagoe limited express trains now have increased frequency in operation whilst a notable amount of inbound evening services operate from Ogawamachi to Ikebukuro whereas all inbound trains start from Shinrinkoen prior to the timetable revision.

See also
 List of railway lines in Japan

References

External links

  

Tojo Line
Railway lines in Tokyo
Rail transport in Saitama Prefecture
1067 mm gauge railways in Japan
Railway lines opened in 1914
1914 establishments in Japan
1500 V DC railway electrification